Pimpirev Peak is the ice-covered peak rising to 2565 m on the west side of Rouen Mountains in northern Alexander Island, Antarctica. It surmounts Frachat Glacier to the southeast, Russian Gap to the west and Mozgovitsa Glacier to the north-northwest.  The peak was visited on 7 January 1988 by the geologists Christo Pimpirev and Borislav Kamenov during the First Bulgarian Antarctic Expedition.

The feature was named "after the Bulgarian scientist Christo Pimpirev, doyen and leader of the national Antarctic programme."

Location

Maps
 British Antarctic Territory. Scale 1:200000 topographic map. DOS 610 – W 69 70. Tolworth, UK, 1971
 Antarctic Digital Database (ADD). Scale 1:250000 topographic map of Antarctica. Scientific Committee on Antarctic Research (SCAR). Since 1993, regularly upgraded and updated

Notes

References
 Pimpirev Peak. SCAR Composite Gazetteer of Antarctica

External links
 Pimpirov Peak. Copernix satellite image

Mountains of Alexander Island
Bulgaria and the Antarctic